Klyatayak (Kelätayaq) is a rural locality (a village) in Kanly-Turkeyevsky Selsoviet, Buzdyaksky District, Bashkortostan, Russia. The population was 57 as of 2010. There are 2 streets.

Geography 
Klyatayak is located 34 km southwest of Buzdyak (the district's administrative centre) by road. Karanay is the nearest rural locality.

References 

Rural localities in Buzdyaksky District